Tris(tert-butoxy)silanethiol is a silicon compound containing three tert-butoxy groups and a rare Si–S–H functional group.  This colourless compound  serves as an hydrogen donor in radical chain reactions.  It was first prepared by alcoholysis of silicon disulfide and purified by distillation:
3 (CH3)3COH  +  SiS2    →    [(CH3)3CO]3SiSH  +  H2S

Since 1962 it was thoroughly studied including its acid-base properties and coordination chemistry with metal ions. It coordinates to metal ions via the sulfur and oxygen donor atoms.

References

Hydrogen compounds
Silicon compounds
Tert-butyl compounds
Reagents for organic chemistry